Radha Gopalam is a 2005 Telugu-language film directed by Bapu and written by Ramana. It stars Srikanth and Sneha in lead roles. The music was composed by Mani Sharma and lyrics were penned by Veturi, Jonnavittula, Mullapudi Venkata Ramana. It is based on the Hollywood film Adam's Rib (1949). The performances of Srikanth and Sneha were critically applauded. The film won three Nandi Awards and was successful at the box office.

Plot
Gopalam (Srikanth) performs tapas and gets Radha (Sneha) as his wife. Gopalam is an assistant public prosecutor. Radha is the daughter of Judge (Ranganath). She applies for a law degree after marriage and passes the exams with high honors. Radha is superior and more talented than Gopalam at work. This trait infuriates Gopalam and it causes a rift between him and Radha. The rest of the story is all about how they survive the ego tiff.

Cast

Srikanth as Gopalam
Sneha as Radha
 Brahmanandam as Clerk
Jayalalitha 
Sunil Sharma as Lord Krishna
Sunil as Lakshmana Rao
Ranganath as Judge (Radha's father)
Rallapalli as Judge
Lahari 
Dharmavarapu Subramanyam 
Venu Madhav as Raju
Kondavalasa Lakshmana Rao 
Raavi Kondala Rao 
M. S. Narayana 
AVS 
L. B. Sriram 
Divyavani 
Sudarshan 
Rajyalakshmi as Radha's mother
Saraawatamma  
IDPL Nirmala 
Lakshmi Reddy 
Kallu Chidambaram as Police officer

Awards
Nandi Awards
 Best Cinematographer - P.R.K. Raju
 Best Choreographer - Srinivas
 Special Jury Award - Sneha

References

External links
 

2000s Telugu-language films
2005 films
Films directed by Bapu
Films with screenplays by Mullapudi Venkata Ramana
Films scored by Mani Sharma